In image processing, stairstep interpolation is a general method for interpolating the pixels after enlarging an image. The key idea is to interpolate multiple times in small increments using any interpolation algorithm that is better than nearest-neighbor interpolation, such as bilinear interpolation, and bicubic interpolation. A common scenario is to interpolate an image by using a bicubic interpolation which increases the image size by no more than 10% (110% of the original size) at a time until the desired size is reached.

Example

See also
 Anti-aliasing
 Bézier surface
 Cubic Hermite spline, the one-dimensional analogue of bicubic spline
 Lanczos resampling
 Sinc filter
 Spline interpolation

External links
 Photoshop plugin to achieve stairstep interpolation

Image processing